The Honourable Bartholemew Bouverie (29 October 1753 – 31 May 1835), was a British politician.

Background and education
Bouverie was the second son of William Bouverie, 1st Earl of Radnor, by his second wife Rebecca Alleyne, daughter of John Alleyne, of Barbados, and sister of Sir John Alleyne, 1st Baronet. He was the half-brother of Jacob Pleydell-Bouverie, 2nd Earl of Radnor, and the full brother of William Henry Bouverie and Edward Bouverie. He was educated at Harrow and University College, Oxford.

Public life
Bouverie was returned to Parliament for Downton in December 1779, but was unseated on petition already in February of the following year. He was once again returned for the constituency in 1790, and continued to represent it until 1796. From 1802 to 1806 he was a Commissioner for auditing public accounts. The latter year he was returned for Downton for a third time, and now held the seat until 1812 and again between 1819 and June 1826, when he lost his seat. However, he was once again elected in December 1826, and continued to sit for the constituency until 1830. In 1829 he had been appointed a Metropolitan Commissioner for Lunacy, which he remained until his death. Bouverie was seldom active in the House of Commons and is not known to have ever spoken.

Family
Bouverie married Mary Wyndham Arundell, daughter of the Honourable James Everard Arundell, in 1779. Their daughter Harriet Bouverie married Archibald Primrose, 4th Earl of Rosebery, and was the grandmother of Archibald Primrose, 5th Earl of Rosebery, Prime Minister of the United Kingdom. Harriet caused a society scandal when she had an affair with her brother-in-law Sir Henry St John-Mildmay, 4th Baronet (the widower of her deceased sister Charlotte). She obtained a divorce from Rosebery and married St John-Mildmay in Stuttgart after obtaining a special permission by the King of Württemberg. Another daughter of Bouverie, Anna Maria Wyndham Bouverie, married Paulet St John-Mildmay, brother of Sir Henry St John-Mildmay, 4th Baronet. Mary Bouverie died in February 1832. Bouverie survived her by three years and died in May 1835, aged 81.

References

External links

1753 births
1835 deaths
People educated at Harrow School
Alumni of University College, Oxford
Younger sons of earls
Civil servants in the Audit Office (United Kingdom)
Members of the Parliament of Great Britain for English constituencies
British MPs 1774–1780
British MPs 1790–1796
Members of the Parliament of the United Kingdom for English constituencies
UK MPs 1806–1807
UK MPs 1807–1812
UK MPs 1818–1820
UK MPs 1820–1826
UK MPs 1826–1830